Karen Staley (born in Weirton, West Virginia) is an American country music singer-songwriter.

Staley was raised in Georgetown, Beaver County, Pennsylvania, and was inspired to write songs after reading through the hymnals at her local church. She continued to do so while at West Virginia Wesleyan College, where she joined the women's fraternity Alpha Gamma Delta. She took a job at a children's home, before moving to Los Angeles, California to sign with a contemporary Christian music label which went out of business before she could release anything.

After winning a talent competition put on by the Wheeling Jamboree, she moved to Nashville, Tennessee, where she wrote three songs on Patty Loveless's self-titled debut album. She signed to MCA Records in the late 1980's, and released the album Wildest Dreams in 1989, which produced two low-charting singles.

In the mid-late 1990s, Staley wrote "The Keeper of the Stars" for Tracy Byrd, and "Take Me as I Am" and "Let's Go to Vegas" for Faith Hill. She released Fearless in 1998 for Warner Bros. Records.

Discography

Albums

Singles

References

External links
Official website

American women country singers
American country singer-songwriters
MCA Records artists
People from Weirton, West Virginia
Warner Records artists
Living people
Year of birth missing (living people)
21st-century American women
Singer-songwriters from West Virginia